"Sunglasses at Night" is a song by British grime artist, Skepta. The song was released as a digital download on 16 March 2009 as the second single from his second studio album Microphone Champion (2009). It samples the original song of the same title by Corey Hart. The song peaked at number 64 on the UK Singles Chart.

Track listing

Chart performance

Weekly charts

References 
Skepta: Konnichiwa – Leaked track listing.

2009 singles
Skepta songs
2009 songs